James Morris Blaut (October 20, 1927 – November 11, 2000) was an American professor of anthropology and geography at the University of Illinois at Chicago. His studies focused on the agricultural microgeography (geographical activity of villagers), cultural ecology, theory of nationalism, philosophy of science, historiography and the relations between the First and the Third World. He is known as one of the most notable critics of Eurocentrism. Blaut was one of the most widely read authors in the field of geography.

Life and career
James Morris Blaut was born on October 20, 1927, in New York City. He attended the Little Red School House and Elisabeth Irwin High School. He entered the University of Chicago in 1944 at the age of sixteen, as part of the program for advanced high-school students, and achieved two bachelor's degrees (in 1948 and 1950). Next, from 1948 to 1949, he studied in the New School for Social Research, from 1949 to 1950 at the Imperial College of Tropical Agriculture in Trinidad, and from 1950 at Louisiana State University. After the end of the Korean War, he also served in the United States Army, and was involved in an incident which resulted in court-martial of his commander and the dismissal of the camp's commandant. In 1954, he was drafted into the army, went to basic training at Camp Gordon, Georgia and served for two years rising to the rank of private first class.

He received his PhD in 1958, at which time he was already working at the Yale University. In 1960 he moved to University of Puerto Rico, where he stayed till 1963. In 1964 he moved to the College of the Virgin Islands. In 1967 he returned to the United States for a position at Clark University, where in 1969 he helped establish the Antipode Journal and the Union of Socialist Geographers. In 1971, told that his activities and ideas were too extreme for Clark, he moved back to the University of Puerto Rico, and finally to University of Illinois at Chicago.

Blaut died from heart failure at his home on November 11, 2000, before he had completed a trilogy of books criticizing Eurocentric theories of a "European miracle". The series begins with The Colonizer’s Model of the World and is followed by the Eight Eurocentric Historians.

He was a member and activist of Henry A. Wallace's Progressive Party.  He supported a variety of activists' campaigns during the Vietnam War. He was also a supporter of the Puerto Rican independence movement.

Legacy and honors
Blaut received several awards for distinguished service and scholarship, such as the Association of American Geographers's Distinguished Scholarship Award in 1997.

The Cultural and Political Ecology Study Group of the Association of American Geographers issues the annual James M. Blaut Award in recognition of innovative scholarship in cultural and political ecology. The Socialist and Critical Geography Specialty Group of the AAG also issues a James Blaut Award and has a Memorial Lecture.

In his private life, his hobbies included bird watching.

Publications
1987 – The National Question: Decolonising the Theory of Nationalism (London: Zed Books)
1992 – Fourteen Ninety-Two: The Debate on Colonialism, Eurocentrism and History (with contributions by S. Amin, R. Dodgshon, A. G. Frank, and R. Palan; Trenton, NJ: AfricaWorld Press)
1993 – The Colonizer’s Model of the World: Geographical Diffusionism and Eurocentric History (NY: Guilford Press)
2000 – Eight Eurocentric Historians (NY: Guilford Press)

See also 
Andre Gunder Frank
Samir Amin
Angus Maddison
John M. Hobson

References
Notes

Further reading
Kent Mathewson, "James Morris Blaut (1927–2000)," pp. 107–130 in H. Lorimer and C.W.J. Withers, editors, Geographers: Biobibliographical Studies, 27 (New York: Continuum, 2008).

External links
James M. Blaut Page
Tributes to Jim Blaut, Marxism mailing list archive
  The Geographical and Political Vision of J. M. Blaut. Special Issue of Antipode, vol. 35, n° 5, pp. 900–1050 (co-edited with B. Wisner) by Kent Mathewson, 2005.

1927 births
2000 deaths
20th-century American male writers
20th-century American non-fiction writers
20th-century American anthropologists
20th-century geographers
American geographers
Clark University faculty
Deaths from congestive heart failure
Little Red School House alumni
Louisiana State University alumni
Military personnel from New York City
Puerto Rican nationalists
Scholars of nationalism
The New School alumni
United States Army soldiers
University of Chicago alumni
University of Illinois Chicago faculty
University of Puerto Rico faculty
Writers from Chicago
Writers from Manhattan
Yale University faculty